The Saratoga Handicap was an American Thoroughbred horse race run annually at the Saratoga Race Course in Saratoga Springs, New York. It was open to horses three years old and upward and raced at a distance of 1¼ miles on dirt. First run in 1901, after sixty years it had its final running in 1961 that was won by Divine Comedy ridden by future Hall of Fame jockey Bill Shoemaker on his 30th birthday. Government wartime restrictions saw the 1943 edition run at Belmont Park.

The 1911–1912 statewide shutdown of  New York horse racing
On June 11, 1908, the Republican controlled New York Legislature under Governor Charles Evans Hughes passed the Hart–Agnew anti-betting legislation with penalties allowing for fines and up to a year in prison. In spite of strong opposition by prominent owners such as August Belmont, Jr. and Harry Payne Whitney, reform legislators were not happy when they learned that betting was still going on between individuals at racetracks and they had further restrictive legislation passed by the New York Legislature in 1910  that made it possible for racetrack owners and members of its board of directors to be fined and imprisoned if anyone was found betting, even privately, anywhere on their premises.  After a 1911 amendment to the law to limit the liability of owners and directors was defeated, every racetrack in New York State shut down. As a result, the Saratoga Handicap was not run in 1911 and 1912.

Records
Speed record:
 2:01.60 – 1¼ miles, Lucky Draw (1946)

Most wins:
 3 – Roamer (1915, 1917, 1918)

Most wins by a jockey:
 6 – Conn McCreary (1941, 1943, 1945, 1946, 1953, 1956)

Most wins by a trainer:
 5 – A. J. Goldsborough (1915, 1917, 1918, 1921, 1923)

Most wins by an owner:
 3 – Andrew Miller (1915, 1917, 1918)

Winners

 Ŧ Woodley Lane Farm was the nom de course for Joe Straus, Lafayette Ward, and Steven B. Wilson

References

Discontinued horse races in New York (state)
Saratoga Race Course
Recurring sporting events established in 1901
Recurring events disestablished in 1961